The Guo Ziyi Memorial Hall or Neihu Red House, formerly known as Neihu Guo Family Estate or Neihu Kuo Family Ancestral Home, is a historical building in Neihu District, Taipei, Taiwan.

History
The building was originally built in 1917 during the Japanese rule of Taiwan by Guo Hua-xi, the borough chief of Neihu Village. It was then became the home for first Neihu Village mayor Kuo Hua-jang (郭華讓) who took office in 1920. In 1999, the building was designated as a historical building by the Taipei City Government. In 2010, the building was renovated by the efforts made by World Guo's Clan Association President Kuo Shih-chi with a cost of NT$50 million. NT$30 million of the fund was donated by the association and another NT$10 million by the city government. It was then officially opened on 3 February 2012 to honor the Tang Dynasty General Guo Ziyi.

Architecture
The building is a 2-story Western-style red brick structure which spreads over an area of 1,178 m2 in a form of T-shape. The wall is decorated with Baroque-style washed terrazzo, earthen sculptures, colored tiles from Japan. The floors were made of wood and supported by fir wood beams. The beams were painted and traditional Taiwanese censers and lanterns are hung. The balcony is of an arch-shaped. It also features a small shop.

Exhibitions
The building exhibits various documents on Tang Dynasty poets, calligraphy and paintings.

Transportation
The building is accessible within walking distance northeast of Wende Station of Taipei Metro.

See also
 List of tourist attractions in Taiwan

References

2012 establishments in Taiwan
Buildings and structures in Taipei
Houses completed in 1917
Houses in Taiwan